George of the Jungle is a 1997 American comedy film directed by Sam Weisman and based on Jay Ward and Bill Scott’s 1967 American animated television series of the same name, which in turn is a spoof of the fictional character Tarzan, created by Edgar Rice Burroughs. The film was produced by Walt Disney Pictures and was released in theatres throughout the United States and Canada on July 16, 1997. It was later aired on Disney Channel in the United States on December 5, 1998. It stars Brendan Fraser as the title character, a primitive man who was raised by animals in an African jungle, Leslie Mann as Ursula, George's love interest, and Thomas Haden Church as her treacherous former fiancé. The film received mixed reviews and grossed $174 million worldwide. A sequel, George of the Jungle 2, was released direct-to-video on October 21, 2003.

Plot
While touring Burundi with local guide Kwame and a trio of porters, San Francisco heiress Ursula Stanhope is tracked down and joined by her fiancé, Lyle Van De Groot, with two poachers named Max and Thor. Kwame tells the group of the "White Ape", a local legend of a superhuman primate that rules the jungle. The next day, Lyle, insistent on taking Ursula home as soon as possible, goes into the jungle with her to find the White Ape, and they are attacked by a lion. Lyle knocks himself out trying to flee while Ursula is saved by the King of the Jungle, George, who takes Ursula to his tree house home and cares for her, introducing her to his three animal friends: Ape, a sapient, talking gorilla who raised George; Shep, an Asian elephant that acts like George's dog; and Tookie, a toco toucan. George is smitten with Ursula and attempts to woo her; Ursula soon reciprocates his attraction, and her time spent with George makes her no longer wish to return home.

Lyle, Max, and Thor find the treehouse, and Lyle confronts Ursula and George. Max and Thor make to shoot Shep for his ivory, and Ape shouts at Shep to run. Everyone is stunned by the sight of a talking ape, and Max and Thor decide to tranquilize and capture him. George runs to stop them and is accidentally shot by Lyle, who thought his gun was a novelty lighter. Lyle and the poachers are imprisoned, and Lyle is identified as the shooter by the porters; Max and Thor are released and resolve to capture Ape to make a fortune in Las Vegas. Meanwhile, Ursula takes George to San Francisco to get medical help for his wound and to see the human world, which George is fascinated with.

While Ursula is at work, George explores San Francisco on his own and uses his vine-swinging to rescue a paraglider tangled in the Bay Bridge. Uninterested in marrying Lyle, Ursula admits the truth to her parents, but her overbearing mother Beatrice objects. At a party intended to celebrate Ursula's engagement, Beatrice takes George aside and coldly tells him she will not let Ursula's engagement fall apart, and refuses to let George be with her. In Africa, Max and Thor capture Ape, who manages to order Tookie to find George before he falls unconscious. Tookie flies to San Francisco, and George returns to the jungle, leaving Ursula in the night. While comforted by her parents, Ursula realizes she loves George and goes to find him with her father's approval.

Ape tricks the poachers into circling the jungle and returning to the treehouse, where George confronts them, though they overwhelm him, tickling George, which makes him surrender, though he eventually gets free and incapacitates them with help from a newly arriving Ursula. However, Lyle arrives too, having escaped prison, joined a cult, and become an ordained minister. Lyle has mercenaries he brought with him subdue George and takes Ursula to the nearby Ape River, where he has a boat waiting to escape while he performs a marriage ceremony. However, the river is a harsh series of rapids that hurtle the two into danger. George escapes the mercenaries and performs a big swing to reach Ursula and Lyle, only to crash painfully into a massive tree, which falls over the river and allows him to pull Ursula to safety. Lyle ends up in a cave and, believing he is still sharing the boat with Ursula, proclaims them wedded; he lights his lighter and beholds that he has just married himself to a gorilla.

George and Ursula declare their love for each other and marry, with Ursula moving into George's treehouse. Some time later, the two are raising a son, George Jr., whom they present to the animals from atop Pride Rock. Meanwhile, Ape moves to Las Vegas and becomes a famous stage performer with Max and Thor as props.

Cast

 Brendan Fraser as George, a young man who was raised in the jungle like Tarzan and frequently crashes into trees while swinging on vines. Fraser had concurrently auditioned for the title role in Disney's serious animated adaptation of Tarzan, which would be released in 1999, but lost to Tony Goldwyn.
 Leslie Mann as Ursula Stanhope, a wealthy heiress and George's love interest.
 Thomas Haden Church as Lyle van de Groot, Ursula's former narcissistic wealthy fiancé and the main antagonist of the movie.
 Richard Roundtree as Kwame, Ursula's jungle guide.
 Greg Cruttwell and Abraham Benrubi as Max and Thor, two poachers and trackers who were working for Lyle.
 John Bennett Perry as Arthur Stanhope, Ursula's supportive father who takes a shine to George.
 Holland Taylor as Beatrice Stanhope, Ursula's controlling mother, who believes that social position is more important than having a loving marriage. She strongly dislikes George.
 Kelly Miracco as Betsy, Ursula's best friend.
 Abdoulaye N'Gom as Kip, Ursula's friend and an African tour guide.
 Michael Chinyamurindi as N'Dugo, Ursula's friend and another African tour guide.
 Lydell M. Cheshier as Baleto, Ursula's friend and the third African tour guide.
 Willie Brown as Mayor Willie L. Brown Jr.
 Lauren Bowles as Ursula's friend
 Afton Smith as Ursula's friend
 Samantha Harris as Ursula's friend
 Noah John Cardoza and Benjamin John Cardoza as George Jr.
 Crystal as Monkey.
 Tai as Shep, the Asian elephant with personality of a dog.
 Joseph, Kaleb and Bongo as The Lion.

Voices
 John Cleese as Ape, a well-educated, talking eastern gorilla who is George’s best friend and foster brother.
 Keith Scott as Narrator.
 Frank Welker as Lion, Little Monkey, Shep, Tooki Tooki Bird, and Gorilla sound effects
 Tress MacNeille as Shep (some many scenes, uncredited)

Gorilla suit performers
 John Cleese – Ape (body)
 Tom Fisher 
 Jody St. Michael
 Philip Tan
 Lief Tilden
 Robert Tygner – Ape (facial puppetry)

Production
The lion, elephant, and bird scenes were all filmed with a mix of real animals, puppetry (especially for the lion fight), and CGI (to show Shep the elephant acting like a dog). The scenes with the orangutan, a chimpanzee, and the capuchin monkeys were filmed with live animals, but some computer work was used in a scene wherein the little monkey imitates George.

Three male African lions were used in this film. Bongo was trained by Bowmanville Zoo's Michael Hackenberger. Joseph's trainer was Charlie Sammut of Salinas, California's Monterey Zoo. Sammut temporarily replaced Fraser as his stunt double for its wrestling scene. Fraser was really holding an animatronic lion. Reno, Nevada's Rick Glassey trained Kaleb. He was the third and final lion to appear onscreen.

The large gorillas who live with George were all costumed actors who were Henson puppeteers. Their faces were remote-controlled animatronic heads, which, along with the yak fur gorilla suits, were provided by Jim Henson's Creature Shop. Other effects were provided by Dream Quest Images.

In the "Pride Rock" scene, when George presents his son to the animals, CGI work is again used.

The jungle setting was constructed on a stage in Playa Del Rey, Los Angeles. The stage was 750 feet long, 71 feet high at the peak, 90 feet wide.

Release

Box office
The film debuted at No. 2 at the box office behind Men in Black and grossed $174.4 million worldwide.

Critical response
On Rotten Tomatoes the film has a score of 55% based on 53 reviews and an average rating of 5.5/10. The site's consensus states: "George of the Jungle is faithful to its source material—which, unfortunately, makes it a less-than-compelling feature film". On Metacritic it has a weighted average score of 53% based on reviews from 18 critics, indicating "mixed or average reviews". Audiences surveyed by CinemaScore gave the film a grade "B+" on scale of A to F.

Gene Siskel and Roger Ebert gave the film two thumbs up on their show At The Movies; Ebert awarded it three out of four stars, 
praising it as "good-natured" and complimenting the cast's comedic performances. Siskel wrote, "What sets the film apart is a script that has the good sense to laugh at itself". James Berardinelli thought "the comedy in George of the Jungle is not sophisticated, but it is frequently audacious and irreverent".

It was nominated for Best Fantasy film at the Saturn Awards.

Home media

Walt Disney Home Video released the film on VHS and LaserDisc in the United States and Canada on December 2, 1997.

Sequel
The film was followed by a direct-to-video sequel, George of the Jungle 2, which picks up five years after the original. Most of the major characters were re-cast using different actors, although Keith Scott, Thomas Haden Church and John Cleese reprised their roles from the original.

References

External links
 
 
 

1990s children's films
1997 romantic comedy films
1997 films
American children's comedy films
American films with live action and animation
American romantic comedy films
1990s English-language films
Films about animals
Films about gorillas
Films about elephants
Films based on television series
Films directed by Sam Weisman
Films scored by Marc Shaiman
Films set in 1996
Films set in 1997
Films set in Africa
Films set in San Francisco
Films set in the 1990s
Films set in the San Francisco Bay Area
Films shot in Hawaii
Films shot in San Francisco
Films with screenplays by Audrey Wells
George of the Jungle
Jungle adventure films
Live-action films based on animated series
Live-action films based on Jay Ward cartoons
Mandeville Films films
Swahili-language films
Walt Disney Pictures films
Films produced by David Hoberman
1990s American films